A bryophilous lichen is one that grows on a bryophyte – that is, on a moss or liverwort. Those which grow on mosses are known as muscicolous lichens, while those grow on liverworts are called hepaticolous lichens. Muscicolous derives from the Latin muscus meaning moss, while the suffix colous means "living or growing in or on". Lichens are slow-growing organisms, and so are far more likely to be overgrown by a bryophyte than to overgrow one. However, they are better able to compete if the bryophyte is sickly or decaying and they can be parasitic upon them. Some, rather than overgrowing the bryophyte, instead live among its branches. Bryophilous lichens are particularly common in heathland and arctic or alpine tundra. Because many are small and inconspicuous, they are easy to overlook.

Citations

References 

 
 
 
 
 
 
 

Lichenology